Académic Club Rangers is a Congolese football club based in Kinshasa. They play their home games at the 80,000 capacity Stade des Martyrs in Kinshasa.

History
Académic Club Rangers was established in 2000 and is currently playing in Linafoot.

References

External links

profile on football database
profile on soccerway
profile on sofascore

Football clubs in the Democratic Republic of the Congo
Football clubs in Kinshasa